is a passenger railway station located in the city of Nishitōkyō, Tokyo, Japan, operated by the private railway operator Seibu Railway.

Lines
All trains except Limited express Koedo services and the Haijima Liner stop at Tanashi Station.

Station layout
The station has two elevated island platforms serving three tracks. Platform 2 and 3 share the same track.

Platforms

History

Tanashi Station opened on 16 April 1927.

Station numbering was introduced on all Seibu Railway lines during fiscal 2012, with Tanashi Station becoming "SS17".

Passenger statistics
In fiscal 2019, the station was the 11th busiest on the Seibu network with an average of 75,418 passengers daily.  
The passenger figures for previous years are as shown below.

Surrounding area
 Nishitokyo Public Hall
 Tokyo Legal Affairs Bureau Tanashi Branch Office
 Citizen Watch Headquarters
 Nishitokyo Post Office
 Nishitokyo City Tanashi General Welfare Center
 Nishitokyo City Tanashicho District Hall
 Shin-ei Animation

In Popular Culture 
The station is a frequent setting in the Japanese animated sitcom Atashin'chi, adjacent to the surrounding region that was formerly Tanashi.

See also
List of railway stations in Japan

References

External links

 Tanashi Station information (Seibu Railway) 

Railway stations in Tokyo
Railway stations in Japan opened in 1927
Stations of Seibu Railway
Seibu Shinjuku Line
Nishitōkyō, Tokyo